Excluding the White House, the Lockkeeper's House, C & O Canal Extension is the oldest building on the National Mall in Washington, D.C. It was built in 1837 at what is now the southwest corner of 17th Street, NW and Constitution Avenue, NW, near Constitution Gardens.

The building dates to a period when the south end of 17th Street, NW was a wharf and Constitution Avenue, NW was the location of a section of the Washington City Canal, which connected the Potomac and Anacostia rivers. An eastward extension of the Chesapeake and Ohio Canal (C&O Canal) met the Potomac River and the Washington City Canal at a canal lock.

The 350 square foot house served the canal lock keeper, who collected tolls, recorded commerce, maintained the canal and managed traffic.

History

The C & O Canal was extended between 1832 and 1833, to connect to the Washington City Canal.
The lockkeeper's house was built in 1837 for toll collecting and record keeping, only to be abandoned in 1855 with the demise of the canal 30 years after its construction — which by then had ceded transportation of heavy goods to the nascent railroads and deteriorated into an open sewer.

In disrepair, the building became a squatters' tenement and in 1903 was partially renovated as a headquarters for the United States Park Police, with a holding cell. The house was relocated west in 1915 and aligned in its original east-west orientation parallel to B Street, NW (now Constitution Avenue, NW), which had been constructed above former sections of the Washington Canal and of the C&O Canal Extension after the covering of the two canals. Changes made to the structure at the time included removal of the original brick chimneys and their replacement with shorter stone chimneys.

On July 4, 1928, the Office of Public Buildings and Public Parks installed a historical plaque on the building's exterior. In 1940, the first floor of the building was used as rest rooms then used as storage. It ultimately sat boarded up for forty years. As the intersection grew, street and sidewalk traffic encroached increasingly on the house until the traffic became adjacent to the house.

The NPS restored the building's exterior to its pre-1915 modifications and replaced the structure's brick chimneys, thus restoring the building to its original 1800s appearance. The building reopened temporarily in late August 2018 and permanently on September 13 of that year. 
The house now serves in its new location as an NPS education center as part of the first phase of a renovation of Constitution Gardens.

Pictures

1900s

2000s

References

External links

http://www.dcmemorials.com/index_indiv0001030.htm
https://www.flickr.com/photos/bootbearwdc/2952691621/
http://www.waymarking.com/waymarks/WM8BMJ
https://web.archive.org/web/20110909162836/http://www.thedctraveler.com/2008/06/lock-keepers-house-on-constitution-ave/
http://wikimapia.org/1006647/Old-Canal-Lock-Keeper-s-House

Buildings and structures on the National Register of Historic Places in Washington, D.C.
Relocated buildings and structures in Washington, D.C.
National Mall